Events in the year 1958 in Japan. It corresponds to Shōwa 33 (昭和33年) in the Japanese calendar.

Incumbents 
Emperor: Hirohito
Prime minister: Nobusuke Kishi
Chief Cabinet Secretary: Kiichi Aichi until June 12, Munenori Akagi
Chief Justice of the Supreme Court: Kōtarō Tanaka
President of the House of Representatives: Shūji Masutani until April 25, Nirō Hoshijima from June 11 until December 13, Ryōgorō Katō
President of the House of Councillors: Tsuruhei Matsuno

Governors
Aichi Prefecture: Mikine Kuwahara 
Akita Prefecture: Yūjirō Obata 
Aomori Prefecture: Iwao Yamazaki 
Chiba Prefecture: Hitoshi Shibata 
Ehime Prefecture: Sadatake Hisamatsu 
Fukui Prefecture: Seiichi Hane 
Fukuoka Prefecture: Taichi Uzaki
Fukushima Prefecture: Zenichiro Satō 
Gifu Prefecture: Kamon Muto (until 16 October); Yukiyasu Matsuno (starting 17 October)
Gunma Prefecture: Toshizo Takekoshi 
Hiroshima Prefecture: Hiroo Ōhara 
Hokkaido: Toshifumi Tanaka 
Hyogo Prefecture: Masaru Sakamoto 
Ibaraki Prefecture: Yoji Tomosue 
Ishikawa Prefecture: Jūjitsu Taya 
Iwate Prefecture: Senichi Abe 
Kagawa Prefecture: Masanori Kaneko 
Kagoshima Prefecture: Katsushi Terazono 
Kanagawa Prefecture: Iwataro Uchiyama 
Kochi Prefecture: Masumi Mizobuchi 
Kumamoto Prefecture: Saburō Sakurai 
Kyoto Prefecture: Torazō Ninagawa 
Mie Prefecture: Satoru Tanaka 
Miyagi Prefecture: Yasushi Onuma 
Miyazaki Prefecture: Jingo Futami 
Nagano Prefecture: Torao Hayashi 
Nagasaki Prefecture: Takejirō Nishioka (until 14 January); Katsuya Sato (starting 2 March)
Nara Prefecture: Ryozo Okuda 
Niigata Prefecture: Kazuo Kitamura
Oita Prefecture: Kaoru Kinoshita 
Okayama Prefecture: Yukiharu Miki 
Osaka Prefecture: Bunzō Akama 
Saga Prefecture: Naotsugu Nabeshima 
Saitama Prefecture: Hiroshi Kurihara 
Shiga Prefecture: Kotaro Mori (until 6 December); Kyujiro Taniguchi (starting 7 December)
Shiname Prefecture: Yasuo Tsunematsu 
Shizuoka Prefecture: Toshio Saitō 
Tochigi Prefecture: Kiichi Ogawa 
Tokushima Prefecture: Kikutaro Hara 
Tokyo: Seiichirō Yasui 
Tottori Prefecture: Shigeru Endo (until 10 November); Jirō Ishiba (starting 3 December)
Toyama Prefecture: Minoru Yoshida 
Wakayama Prefecture: Shinji Ono 
Yamagata Prefecture: Tōkichi Abiko 
Yamaguchi Prefecture: Taro Ozawa 
Yamanashi Prefecture: Hisashi Amano

Events 

January 26 – According to Japan Coast Guard official confirmed report, a passenger ferry Nankai Maru capsized Kii Channel, between Wakayama City to Tokushima City, total 167 persons drowned. 
March 1 – Two medium-size airlines, FarEastern Airways of Japan and Nippon Helicopter Transport, are merged to become All Nippon Airways (ANA) which begins operation in Japan.
March 9 – The Kanmon Tunnel opens, connecting Honshu and Kyushu by road for the first time.
April Unknown date – Ohyama Blow Manufacturing, as predecessor of Iris Ohyama was founded.
May 2 – Nagasaki Flag incident - Ultra-nationalists pull down a Chinese flag hanging outside an exhibition of postage stamps in Nagasaki, freezing relations between China and Japan.
May 22 – General election of 1958 - The Liberal Democratic Party win 298 out of 467 seats.
June 24 – According to official Japanese government confirmed report, a large scale eruption in Mount Aso, Kumamoto Prefecture, killed a total of twelve persons, and wounded 28.
August 2 – An All Nippon Airways Douglas DC-3 plunges in the sea close to the Izu Islands, killing all 33 occupants of the aircraft.
August 25 – Instant noodles go on sale for the first time in Japan.
September 27 – Typhoon Ida kills at least 1,269 in Honshu.
October 14 – Construction of Tokyo Tower is completed. 
November 10 – According to Japan Meteorological Agency official confirmed report, a large scale erupted in Mount Asama, Gunma Prefecture, ash height maximum 8,000 meters.
December 23 – Tokyo Tower is opened to the public for the first time, at a final cost of ¥2.8 billion ($8.4 million in 1958).
December 27 – National Health Care Act of 1958.
unknown date - The Japanese 10 yen coin ceases having serrated edges after a 5-year period beginning in 1953. All 10 yen coins since have smooth edges.

Births 
 January 5 – Junko Yagami, singer and songwriter 
 January 20 – Masuo Amada, voice actor
 January 30 – Sayuri Ishikawa, enka singer
 February 1 – Ryō Horikawa, voice actor
 February 4 – Saburō Tokitō, singer and actor
 February 11 – Shinobu Satouchi, voice actor
 March 10 – Hiroshi Yanaka, voice actor
 April 1 – Hiromi Kawakami, author and writer
 April 7 – Shinobu Adachi, voice actress
 April 12 – Hyōichi Kōno, adventurer (d. 2001)
 April 14 – Junko Sakurada, actress and singer
 April 21 – Yoshito Usui, manga artist, creator of Crayon Shin-chan (d. 2009)
 May 2 – Yasushi Akimoto, record producer, lyricist and television writer
 June 14 – Masami Yoshida, javelin thrower (d. 2000)
 June 20 – Teiyū Ichiryūsai, voice actress
 July 5 – Kyoko Terase, voice actress
 July 22 – Tatsunori Hara, professional-baseball coach and player
 August 2 – Shō Hayami, voice actor and singer
 August 15 – Chiharu Suzuka, voice actress
 September 8
 Mitsuru Miyamoto, voice actor
 Reiko Terashima, manga artist and illustrator
 October 15 – Masako Katsuki, voice actress
 October 23 – Hiroyuki Kinoshita, actor and voice actor
 October 24 – Hatsuhiko Tsuji, professional baseball m coach and former player  
 November 12 – Hiromi Iwasaki, singer
 November 27 – Tetsuya Komuro, music producer and songwriter
 December 2 – Mina Asami, actress
 December 26 – Mieko Harada, actress

Date unknown
 Yoshiteru Otani, cartoonist

Deaths 
 April 2 – Jōsei Toda, educator and peace activist (b. 1900)
 September 20 – Ogasawara Naganari, admiral and naval strategist (b. 1867)

See also
 List of Japanese films of 1958

References

 
Japan
Years of the 20th century in Japan